"Gloria in excelsis Deo" (Latin for "Glory to God in the highest") is a Christian hymn known also as the Greater Doxology (as distinguished from the "Minor Doxology" or Gloria Patri) and the Angelic Hymn/Hymn of the Angels. The name is often abbreviated to Gloria in Excelsis or simply Gloria.

Other verses were added very early, forming a doxology.

An article by David Flusser links the text of the verse in Luke with ancient Jewish liturgy.

History
Gloria in excelsis Deo is an example of  the psalmi idiotici ("private psalms", i.e. compositions by individuals in imitation of the  biblical Psalter) that were popular in the 2nd and 3rd centuries. Other surviving examples of this lyric poetry are the Te Deum and the Phos Hilaron. In the 4th century it became part of morning prayers, and is still recited in the Byzantine Rite Orthros service.

The Latin translation is traditionally attributed to Hilary of Poitiers (c. 300–368), who may have learned it while in the East (359–360); as such, it is part of a loose tradition of early Latin translations of the scripture known as the Vetus Latina. The Vulgate Latin translation of the Bible was commissioned only in 382. 

However, this word is used near the end: tu solus Altissimus, Iesu Christe (you alone the Most High, Jesus Christ).

Present-day Greek Orthodox text

Present-day Coptic text

Present-day Latin text

Liturgical use

Byzantine Rite
In the Byzantine Rite (used by the Eastern Orthodox and some Eastern Catholic Churches), the Gloria is referred to as the Doxology, and there are two forms: the Greater Doxology and the Lesser Doxology. The Greater Doxology is always sung, whereas the Lesser Doxology is read. There are certain textual differences between the two, and the order is somewhat altered in the two forms.

The Greater Doxology is used in the Orthros (Matins) on Sundays and feast days. The Lesser Doxology is used at Matins on simple weekdays and at the Apodeipnon (Compline), but not in the  Divine Liturgy.

Alexandrine Rite 
In the Alexandrine Rite (used by the Coptic Orthodox Church and some other Oriental Orthodox Churches), the Gloria is a common congregational prayer, sometime referred to as the "Praise of the Angels". It is recited collectively by the congregation during the Morning Raising of Incense, as well as at the Matins prayer of the Agpeya (the Alexandrian Canonical Book of the Hours). The first verse of the hymn is also recited at the dismissal of the Divine Liturgy before the chanting of the "Concluding Canon".

Roman Rite
By contrast, in the Roman Rite this hymn is not included in the Liturgy of the Hours, but is sung or recited at Mass, after the Kyrie, on Sundays outside of Lent and Advent, during the octaves of Easter and Christmas, and on solemnities and feasts.

In Masses celebrated in accordance with the 1962 Roman Missal (authorized as an extraordinary form of the Roman Rite), the Gloria is sung much more frequently: the 1960 Code of Rubrics require it at Mass when in the corresponding Office of the day the Te Deum is said at Matins. It is thus used not only on I and II-class feasts (corresponding to solemnities and  feasts in the post-Vatican II Mass) but also on III-class feasts (corresponding to memorials in the later form). In the 1962 form it is also said on ferias of Christmastide and Paschaltide even outside the octaves, but is omitted during the Septuagesima season, which does not exist in the post-Vatican II liturgy. The Gloria is also sung in both the pre-Vatican II and in the later form of the Roman Rite at the Mass of the Lord's Supper in the evening of Maundy Thursday and at the Easter Vigil.

A tradition recorded in the Liber Pontificalis attributes to Pope Telesphorus (128–139?) the use of the hymn at the Mass of Christmas Day and to Pope Symmachus (498–514) its use on Sundays and the feasts of martyrs, but only by bishops; the right to use it was later extended to priests, at first only at Easter and on the day of their ordination, but by the end of the 11th century priests, as well as bishops, used it in the Mass on Sundays and feasts outside of Lent and Pre-Lent. After the 12th century Advent began to be considered a penitential period in imitation of Lent, to the exclusion therefore of the Gloria in excelsis Deo.

Protestant Usage
Anglican

In the Church of England's 1549 edition of the Book of Common Prayer, it was used in the same position as in the Roman Rite but was later moved to the end of the service, immediately before the concluding blessing. Revisions to the Prayer Book produced the 1552 prayer book and later the 1662 prayer book, but this placement was retained by the Anglican Communion until the 20th century. Common Worship provides two Orders, one of which places the hymn in the earlier position.

The 1928 United States Episcopal prayer book also placed the Gloria at the end of the Eucharist service (like the 1662 prayer book). This edition, still the standard in the breakaway Continuing Anglican churches, allows the hymn to be used in place of the Gloria Patri after the psalms and canticles at Evening Prayer. The Episcopal Church's 1979 Book moved it to the beginning, after or in place of the Kyrie in Rite One. In a Rite Two (i.e., contemporary language) service of Holy Eucharist, the Gloria, or another song of praise, is sung or said on all Sundays except those in Advent or Lent. It may also be used at other times as desired excepting Lent and Advent.

Lutheran

The hymn is also used in the Divine Service of the Lutheran Church, and in the services of many other Christian churches.

Gloria in the Mass ordinary

Associated ceremonial

Roman Rite
In the Tridentine Mass, the priest is instructed, when saying the opening phrase "Gloria in excelsis Deo", to extend his hands and raise them to shoulder height and, at the word "Deo", to join them and bow his head. He is then to continue the recitation standing erect with hands joined and bowing his head to the cross at the words "Adoramus te", "Gratias agimus tibi", "Iesu Christe" (twice), and "Suscipe deprecationem nostram", and at the concluding phrase (as also at the concluding phrase of the Nicene Creed and the Sanctus), to make a large sign of the cross on himself. At High Mass the priest intones the opening phrase, while the deacon and subdeacon stand behind him; then they join him at the altar and together with him quietly recite the rest of the hymn, after which they sit down and wait for the choir to finish its singing of the same text.

The Roman Missal as revised in 1970 simplifies this, saying: "The Gloria is intoned by the priest or, if appropriate, by a cantor or by the choir; but it is sung either by everyone together, or by the people alternately with the choir, or by the choir alone. If not sung, it is to be recited either by all together or by two parts of the congregation responding one to the other." No particular ritual gestures are prescribed.

Byzantine Rite
In the usage of the Eastern Orthodox Church and those Eastern Catholic Churches which follow the Byzantine Rite, the Great Doxology is one of the high points of the festal Matins service. The priest puts on his phelonion (chasuble). When it comes time for the Great Doxology the deacon opens the Holy Doors, and the priest raises his hands orans and exclaims: "Glory to Thee, Who hast shown us the Light!", and the choir begins chanting the Doxology, while all of the oil lamps and candles in the temple are lit. The Great Doxology concludes with the chanting of the Trisagion and leads into the chanting of the Troparion of the Day. If the bishop is present he vests in his full pontifical vestments for the Great Doxology, and the subdeacons stand behind the Holy Table (altar) holding the lit dikirion and trikirion.

When the Lesser Doxology is called for, it is simply said by the reader, the priest does not put on his phelonion, the Holy Doors remain closed and no lamps or candles are lit. The Lesser Doxology does not end with the Trisagion and is followed by an ektenia (litany).

In liturgical calendars it is symbolized by a red mis-shapen semicircle (with the opening to one side) with three dots inside.

Musical settings 

The Gloria has been and still is sung to a wide variety of melodies. Modern scholars have catalogued well over two hundred of them used in the medieval church. The Roman Missal indicates several different plainchant melodies. In addition, several "farced" Glorias were composed in the Middle Ages and were still sung in places when the Roman Missal was revised by order of Pope Pius V in 1570.  These expanded the basic Gloria by, for instance, adding to mentions of Jesus Christ a mention of some relationship between him and his mother. The use of these additional phrases in honour of the Blessed Virgin Mary was so common that in editions of the Roman Missal earlier than the 1921 revision, the text of the Gloria was followed by the rubric: "Sic dicitur Gloria in excelsis Deo, etiam in Missis beatæ Mariæ, quando dicenda est" (When the Gloria in excelsis Deo is to be recited, it is recited in this way, even in Masses of Blessed Mary).

Almost all polyphonic settings of the Mass include the Gloria. In addition, there are a number of settings of the Gloria alone, including: 
 Antonio Vivaldi, who wrote two: the widely recorded RV 589, and the less famous RV 588
 George Frideric Handel, whose setting for solo soprano and strings was rediscovered in 2001: Gloria
 Camille Saint-Saëns
 Francis Poulenc: Gloria
 William Walton
 John Rutter: Gloria
 Mike Anderson: Gloria
 Karl Jenkins, who interpolates other texts alongside the standard Gloria text: Gloria

A paraphrase of the text in German, the early Lutheran hymn , has also been commonly set to music, in the form of chorale preludes or as part of larger compositions. The free paraphrase "Ich lobe meinen Gott, der aus der Tiefe mich holt" became a 1979 hymn of the genre Neues Geistliches Lied, similarly "Ich lobe meinen Gott von ganzem Herzen" the same year.

The popular Christmas carol "Angels We Have Heard on High" is derived from the beginning of the Gloria, which it uses as a refrain. It has been translated into several languages. 

The Gloria features prominently in the popular song "Silence" by Delerium, a trance song as well as in Gina's and Elvira's theme from the Scarface soundtrack.

The first phrase is also present in Bladee and Ecco2K's track '5 Star Crest (4 Vattenrum)' from their collaborative album 'Crest.'

Some official English translations
Book of Common Prayer (1662)

ICET ecumenical version (1975)

Ecumenical Patriarchate of Constantinople New Rome, Archdiocese of Thyateira and Great Britain

See also
 "Gloria" (U2 song)
 Luke 2
 Phos Hilaron
 Te Deum
 Alleluia
 Tract (liturgy)

Notes

References

External links

Christian prayer
Christian liturgical music
Eastern Christian hymns
Gospel of Luke
Latin religious words and phrases
Latin-language Christian hymns
New Testament Latin words and phrases
Order of Mass
Vulgate Latin words and phrases